End of Part One: Their Greatest Hits is the first compilation album released by Scottish pop rock quartet Wet Wet Wet. Released on 8 November 1993, the album serves as a comprehensive collection of the band's single discography, featuring all sixteen singles released between 1987 and 1993, plus two new songs—"Shed a Tear" and "Cold Cold Heart"—which were recorded by Nile Rodgers at The Hit Factory in New York City, where the album's artwork was also shot. Both went on to be released as a singles.

The album peaked at No. 4 on the UK Albums Chart. An accompanying VHS video, containing the band's fifteen music videos to date, was released three days after the album on 11 November. In 1994, following the release of the band's biggest hit to date, "Love Is All Around", the album was re-released containing the aforementioned song as a bonus track. Subsequently, the album re-entered the UK Albums Chart, this time peaking at No. 1. A US-only version of the album, Part One, was released on 26 July 1994, peaking at No. 24 on the Billboard 200.

Tracklisting

† Edited to replace the line "don't waste my fucking spirit" with "don't waste my angry spirit"

Charts

Weekly charts

Year-end charts

Certifications

References

Wet Wet Wet albums
1993 greatest hits albums